Paola Croce (born March 6, 1978, in Rome) is an Italian volleyball player, who plays as a libero. She currently plays for RC Cannes.

She has twice competed at the Olympics as part of the Italian national team, finishing 5th in 2008 and 2012.  She was part of the Italian team that won the 2007 European Championship.  In the same year, she was part of the Italian team that won the bronze medal at the World Grand Prix.

References

 Profile

External links

 
 
 

1978 births
Living people
Sportspeople from Rome
Italian women's volleyball players
Volleyball players at the 2008 Summer Olympics
Volleyball players at the 2012 Summer Olympics
Olympic volleyball players of Italy
Mediterranean Games medalists in volleyball
Mediterranean Games gold medalists for Italy
Competitors at the 2009 Mediterranean Games